Nudaria fulvipicta is a moth of the subfamily Arctiinae. It was described by George Hampson in 1896. It is found in Assam, India.

References

 

Nudariina
Moths described in 1896